Trower may refer to:

People:
Alfred Trower (1849–1880), English rower who won events at Henley Royal Regatta
Charles Trower (1817–1891), English first-class cricketer and barrister
Charlotte Georgina Trower (born 1855), British botanical illustrator and botanist
Gerard Trower (1860–1928), Anglican bishop
John S. Trower (1849–1911), American businessman
John Trower Wilkins III (1880–1929), American politician in the Virginia House of Delegates
Jonathan Trower (born 1979), English cricketer
Peter Trower (1930–2017), Canadian poet and novelist
Robin Trower (born 1945), English rock guitarist and vocalist with Procol Harum during the 1960s
Robin Trower Hogg (born 1932), former senior Royal Navy officer
Ross H. Trower (1922–2014), rear admiral and Chief of Chaplains of the United States Navy
Rudolph Trower Hogg CMG CIE (1877–1955), senior British Indian Army officer during the First World War
Tandy Trower, engineer and software developer with a long career in the IT industry
Walter Trower, Anglican bishop in the second half of the 19th century
William Trower (born 1959), British barrister, Justice of the High Court of England and Wales

Places:
Old Trower, Virginia, unincorporated community in Accomack County, Virginia
Trower, Virginia, unincorporated community in Accomack County, Virginia
Trower Road, major arterial road in Darwin, Northern Territory, Australia

See also
William B. Trower Bayshore Natural Area Preserve, Natural Area Preserve in Northampton County, Virginia
Thrower
Trowers